Molashiyeh-ye Yek (also Romanized as Molāshīyeh-ye Yek) is a village in Esmailiyeh Rural District, in the Central District of Ahvaz County, Khuzestan Province, Iran. At the 2006 census, its population was 20,883, in 3,621 families.

References 

Populated places in Ahvaz County